Carroll Moran is a former judge of the Irish High Court from 2014 to 2015. He was a judge of the Circuit Court from 1997 to 2014.  He is chairperson of the non-statutory inquiry into the 2016 Summer Olympics ticket scandal.

He was educated at Clongowes Wood College and University College Dublin. He became a solicitor in 1970. He was called to the Irish Bar in 1975. He was editor of the Irish Reports from 1993 to 1997.

References

External links
University College Dublin
The Honorable Society of the Kings Inns

20th-century Irish lawyers
Alumni of University College Dublin
High Court judges (Ireland)
Circuit Court (Ireland) judges
People educated at Clongowes Wood College
1945 births
Living people